Sofronije may refer to:

 Sofronije Podgoričanin (1668 - 1711), the Metropolitan of Karlovac
 Sofronije Kirilović (died 1786), Serbian Orthodox bishop in the Habsburg
 Sofronije Jugović-Marković (fl. 1789), Habsburg Serb writer and activist in Russian service

See also 
 Sofronie
 Sofron